This is a list of electoral results for the electoral district of Townsville East in Queensland state elections.

Members for Townsville East

Election results

Elections in the 1980s

References

Queensland state electoral results by district